Janah ad-Dawla was the Seljuq emir of Homs during the First Crusade. He was the atabeg of Ridwan who took control of Aleppo after the death of Ridwan's father Tutush I in 1095.  He later joined Kerbogha's army during the second siege of Antioch in 1098.  He was murdered by three Assassins in 1103, apparently by order of al-Hakim al-Munajjim and apparently instigated by Ridwan.

References

Emirs
Rulers of Syria
11th-century monarchs in the Middle East
Muslims of the First Crusade
People of the Nizari–Seljuk wars
Victims of the Order of Assassins